(Death and the Painter) is a ballet with singers in two acts by choreographer Bridget Breiner and composer, Michelle DiBucci. Or Theater?) by Charlotte Salomon (1917–1943).

Composition 
When Zimmermann died in 2007, the project was put on hold. DiBucci was next invited by choreographer Bridget Breiner to adapt the work for her ballet company, Ballet im Revier.

Performance history 
The world premiere was on 14 February 2015 at Musiktheater im Revier, Gelsenkirchen, Germany with Michael Schulz as intendant. The work was then remounted at Musiktheater im Revier in their 2015/2016 season. It was conducted both times by Finnish conductor and music director Valtteri Rauhalammi, leading the Neue Philharmonie Westfalen.

Critical reception 
Charlotte Salomon: Der Tod und die Malerin opened to positive reviews from the German press. Dorion Weickmann from Süddeutsche Zeitung praised the work by writing, "Can this subject matter be melded into a ballet soirée? Can dance meet the demands of that fragment of history? Gelsenkirchen's ballet director Bridget Breiner, together with the composer Michelle DiBucci, answered this question with a resounding, triumphant, yes!"

Breiner and the large cast of highly motivated dancers, singers and musicians created a complex evening of exceptional intensity."

Marieluise Jeitschko commented in Theater Pur, "Michelle DiBucci composed a gripping score for Breiner's ballet, with a brilliant stage set by Juergen Kirner. The Neue Philharmonie Wesphalia performed passionately under Valtteri Rauhalammi. The Ballet im Revier keeps raising its profile. All involved gained the respect of, and were celebrated by the audience attending the premiere."

Awards 
Charlotte Salomon: Der Tod und die Malerin was nominated for two Faust Awards: Bridget Breiner for choreography (won), Kusha Alexi for lead dancer.

Roles 
The ballet is for 13 dancers, 6 singers and a chamber orchestra of 17 players.

References

2015 ballet premieres
Ballets based on actual events
Cultural depictions of Charlotte Salomon